Toby Jon Crouse (born 1975) is a United States district judge of the United States District Court for the District of Kansas. He was formerly the Solicitor General of Kansas.

Biography 

Crouse received his Bachelor of Arts from Kansas State University and his Juris Doctor from the University of Kansas School of Law, where he was Articles Editor of the Kansas Law Review and was inducted into the Order of the Coif. Crouse began his career as a law clerk to Judge Monti Belot of the United States District Court for the District of Kansas and Judge Mary Beck Briscoe of the United States Court of Appeals for the Tenth Circuit. He then worked at the firm Foulston Siefkin. 

Crouse served as Solicitor General of Kansas from January 2018 to December 2020. As Solicitor General, he argued and won two cases before the Supreme Court of the United States. Those cases are Kahler v. Kansas and Kansas v. Glover. He left the Kansas Attorney General's office after his appointment to the bench.

Federal judicial service 

On May 7, 2020, President Donald Trump announced his intent to nominate Crouse to serve as a United States district judge of the United States District Court for the District of Kansas. On May 21, 2020, his nomination was sent to the United States Senate. Crouse was nominated to the seat vacated by Judge Carlos Murguia, who resigned on April 1, 2020. A hearing on his nomination before the Senate Judiciary Committee was held on July 29, 2020. On September 17, 2020, his nomination was reported out of committee by a 12–10 vote. On November 17, 2020, the United States Senate invoked cloture on his nomination by a 51–44 vote. Later that day, his nomination was confirmed by a 50–43 vote. He received his judicial commission on December 2, 2020.

Memberships 

Crouse has been a member of the Federalist Society since 2019.

References

External links 
 
 Appearances at the U.S. Supreme Court from the Oyez Project
 

|-

1975 births
Living people
21st-century American lawyers
21st-century American judges
Federalist Society members
Judges of the United States District Court for the District of Kansas
Kansas lawyers
Kansas State University alumni
People from McPherson, Kansas
Solicitors General of Kansas
United States district court judges appointed by Donald Trump
University of Kansas School of Law alumni